Walker County is a county located in the central portion of the U.S. state of Alabama. As of the 2020 census, the population was 65,342. Its county seat is Jasper. Its name is in honor of John Williams Walker, the first U.S. senator elected from Alabama.

Walker County comprises the entirety of the Jasper, AL Micropolitan Statistical Area.

History
Walker County was established on December 26, 1823, and formed from sections of Marion and Tuscaloosa counties.
It was named after Senator John Walker, who represented Alabama in the U.S. Senate from 1819 to 1822. The county was greatly reduced in size on February 12, 1850, when its northern half became the county of Winston.
Jasper is the county seat, and was named after William Jasper, a Revolutionary War hero from South Carolina.

National Register of Historic Places
Walker County has sites listed on the National Register of Historic Places.  They include the Bankhead House, Boshell's Mill, the First United Methodist Church of Jasper, the Gilchrist House, the Jasper Downtown Historic District, the Stephenson House, and Walker County Hospital.

Geography
The county is located in the Cumberland Plateau region, with many plateaus and valleys, along with many forested areas, covering the county.

Adjacent counties
Winston County (north)
Cullman County (northeast)
Blount County (east)
Jefferson County (southeast)
Tuscaloosa County (southwest)
Fayette County (west)
Marion County (northwest)

Demographics

2000 census
At the 2000 census there were 70,713 people, 28,364 households, and 20,478 families living in the county.  The population density was 89 people per square mile (34/km2).  There were 32,417 housing units at an average density of 41 per square mile (16/km2).  The racial makeup of the county was 92.15% White, 6.17% Black or African American, 0.28% Native American, 0.20% Asian, 0.02% Pacific Islander, 0.31% from other races, and 0.86% from two or more races.  Nearly 0.86% of the population were Hispanic or Latino of any race.
In 2000 the largest reported ancestry groups in Walker County, AL were:
  American 27.7%
  Irish 8.8%
  English 6.8%
  African American 6.17%
  German 3.9%
  Scottish 1.4%
  Scotch-Irish 1.4%

There were 28,364 households, 30.70% had children under the age of 18 living with them; 56.30% were married couples living together, 11.90% had a female householder with no husband present, and 27.80% were non-families. 25.30% of households were made up of individuals, and 11.20% were one person aged 65 or older.  The average household size was 2.46, and the average family size was 2.93.

The age distribution was 23.50% under the age of 18, 8.60% from 18 to 24, 28.00% from 25 to 44, 25.10% from 45 to 64, and 14.80% 65 or older.  The median age was 38 years. For every 100 females, there were 93.20 males.  For every 100 females age 18 and over, there were 89.80 males.

The median household income was $29,076 and the median family income  was $35,221. Males had a median income of $31,242 versus $20,089 for females. The per capita income for the county was $15,546.  About 13.20% of families and 16.50% of the population were below the poverty line, including 21.00% of those under age 18 and 17.40% of those age 65 or over.

2010 census
At the 2010 census there were 67,023 people, 26,571 households, and 18,741 families living in the county. The population density was 85 people per square mile (33/km2). There were 30,816 housing units at an average density of 38 per square mile (15/km2). The racial makeup of the county was 91.2% White, 5.9% Black or African American, 0.4% Native American, 0.3% Asian, 0.1% Pacific Islander, 1.0% from other races, and 1.2% from two or more races. Nearly 2.0% of the population were Hispanic or Latino of any race.
There were 26,571 households, 26.8% had children under the age of 18 living with them; 52.0% were married couples living together, 13.3% had a female householder with no husband present, and 29.5% were non-families. 25.8% of households were made up of individuals, and 11.2% were one person aged 65 or older. The average household size was 2.49, and the average family size was 2.97.

The age distribution was 22.5% under the age of 18, 8.1% from 18 to 24, 24.4% from 25 to 44, 28.7% from 45 to 64, and 16.3% 65 or older. The median age was 41.2 years. For every 100 females, there were 95.1 males. For every 100 females age 18 and over, there were 97.8 males.

The median household income was $37,191 and the median family income  was $45,788. Males had a median income of $43,671 versus $27,662 for females. The per capita income for the county was $20,516. About 14.7% of families and 18.6% of the population were below the poverty line, including 27.5% of those under age 18 and 12.4% of those age 65 or over.

2020 census

As of the 2020 United States census, there were 65,342 people, 25,153 households, and 17,410 families residing in the county.

Economy
Local officials have described coal mining as "literally at the core" of the county's economy.

Government

Transportation

Major highways

 Interstate 22
 U.S. Highway 78
 State Route 5
 State Route 13
 State Route 18
 State Route 69
 State Route 102
 State Route 118
 State Route 124
 State Route 195
 State Route 257
 State Route 269

Rail
BNSF Railway
Norfolk Southern Railway

Communities

Cities
Carbon Hill
Cordova
Dora
Jasper (county seat)
Sumiton (partly in Jefferson County)

Towns
Eldridge
Kansas
Nauvoo (partly in Winston County)
Oakman
Parrish
Sipsey

Unincorporated communities

Aldridge
Argo
Benoit
Boldo
Burnwell
Coal Valley
Corinth
Corona
Curry
Dogtown
Empire
Goodsprings
Gorgas (partly in Tuscaloosa County)
Hilliard 
Lupton
Manchester
McCollum
Mount Hope
Patton
Quinton
Saragossa
Slicklizzard
Spring Hill
Townley
Union Chapel

Places of interest
Walker County is home to the William B. Bankhead National Forest and Lewis Smith Lake, in addition to the Alabama Mining Museum.

See also
National Register of Historic Places listings in Walker County, Alabama
Properties on the Alabama Register of Landmarks and Heritage in Walker County, Alabama

References

External links
 Walker County map of roads/towns (map © 2007 Univ. of Alabama).

 

 
1823 establishments in Alabama
Populated places established in 1823
Birmingham metropolitan area, Alabama
Counties of Appalachia